The Greater Cooch Behar Democratic Party is a political party in the northern areas of West Bengal, India. The party strives to create a separate 'Greater Cooch Behar' state. The GCBDP was founded in 2006, after a split in the Greater Cooch Behar People's Association (GCPA). Ashutosh Barma is the president of the party. Bangshibadan Barman, the erstwhile jailed general secretary of the GCPA, sided with the GCBDP in the split and became a member of the new party.

The GCBDP cooperates with  the Kamtapur Progressive Party, which strive for the creation of Kamtapur states respectively. The alliance between the three parties was made public in March 2008. The three parties have potentially overlapping territorial claims for their respective prospective states, but decided to leave those issues at side when initiating cooperation between the organisations.

In June 2008, the GCBDP organised a fast-unto-death hunger strike, demanding the release of Bangshibadan Barman and 55 other followers of the party (who had been arrested at a 2005 GCPA meeting). The fast was however called off by the party on June 9, 2008, after talks with senior administration officials.

In the 2009 Lok Sabha election, the GCBDP launched Bangshibadan Barman as its candidate in the Cooch Behar constituency. Barman became the first undertrial prisoner to file his nomination papers for a parliamentary election in West Bengal. In the end, Barman obtained 37,226 votes (3.3% of the votes in the constituency).

References

Political parties in West Bengal
Political parties established in 2006
Politics of Cooch Behar district
2006 establishments in West Bengal